Gusty Bausch (born ) is a Luxembourgian cyclo-cross cyclist. He represented his nation in the men's elite event at the 2016 UCI Cyclo-cross World Championships in Heusden-Zolder.

Major results

1997–1998
 1st  National Junior Championships
2000–2001
 1st  National Under-23 Championships
 2nd National Championships
2001–2002
 1st  National Under-23 Championships
2002–2003
 1st  National Championships
2004–2005
 1st  National Championships
 3rd Grand Prix Max Point
2005–2006
 2nd National Championships
2006–2007
 1st  National Championships
2007–2008
 2nd National Championships
 3rd G.P. GEBA Sarl
2008–2009
 1st  National Championships
2009–2010
 2nd National Championships
 3rd Grand Prix DAF
2010–2011
 2nd National Championships
2011–2012
 1st  National Championships
2014–2015
 2nd National Championships
2015–2016
 2nd National Championships
2016–2017
 3rd National Championships
2017–2018
 2nd National Championships
2018–2019
 2nd National Championships

References

External links
 

1980 births
Living people
Cyclo-cross cyclists
Luxembourgian male cyclists